Synapse Gap (Mundo Total) is an album by Joe "King" Carrasco & the Crowns, released in 1982.

Production
Produced by Tony Ferguson, the album was recorded at Studio 55, in Los Angeles. The Jackson 5 were also recording at the studio; Carrasco became friendly with Michael and asked him to contribute harmony vocals to "Don't Let A Woman (Make A Fool Out Of You)". Some of the album's songs were cowritten with keyboardist Kris Cummings.

Critical reception

Robert Christgau wrote that "nothing drags, nothing protrudes, and the Zorba solo and reggae number could come off a Sam the Sham album." The Oklahoman deemed the album "a mixture of danceable Tex-Mex melodies, Jamaican rhythms and Carrasco's energetic vocals centered around an old fashioned Farfisa organ." Texas Monthly thought that Carrasco's "music has an edge on most New Wave: his sound is positive, humorous, and upward-moving."

Track listing

Personnel
Joe "King" Carrasco - vocals, guitar
Kris Cummings - keyboards
Michael Jackson - backing vocals

References

1982 albums
MCA Records albums